Mark Irvan Choate  is a history professor at Brigham Young University and adjunct research professor at the Strategic Studies Institute, U.S. Army War College, specializing in the history of Europe, the Mediterranean, and the world, specifically international relations, migration, colonialism, and grand strategy. He emphasizes the relationships between international emigration, immigration, and colonialism, and transnational influences in the fields of diplomacy, trade, currency exchange, and military power.

Early life 
After living in Pago Pago, American Samoa, and Pittsburgh, Pennsylvania, as a child, Choate grew up in rural Osage County, Oklahoma, and graduated from Charles Page High School in Sand Springs. While a freshman at Yale College, he enlisted as a medic in the 179th Infantry Regiment (United States),  Army National Guard, using  the G.I. Bill to help pay for school.

Fellowships and memberships 
He has been a Fellow of the Royal Historical Society since 2008, and a fellow of the Società Italiana per lo Studio della Storia Contemporanea since 2009. He was a visiting fellow at the Centre d'études et de recherches internationales at Sciences Po, Paris, in 2014-2015.

Distinctions 
2017: Daniel M. Lewin Cyber-Terrorism Technology Writing Award, U.S. Army War College 
2009: Howard R. Marraro Prize 
2010: Council for European Studies Book Award 
2010: BYU Class of 1949 Young Faculty Award teaching prize 
2002: Hans W. Gatzke Prize, Yale University 
1998-1999: Fulbright Fellow in Italy

Military service 

Choate enlisted in 1989 as a Private first class in the Oklahoma National Guard. He completed basic training at Fort Jackson and advanced individual training as a medic at Fort Sam Houston. Choate ended his enlistment at the rank of staff sergeant upon being commissioned as a mustang officer through Officer Candidate School in 1994.

Dates of rank

Decorations and badges

Choate's decorations and badges include the following:

Works 
 Emigrant Nation: The Making of Italy Abroad (Harvard University Press, 2008) 
 "Italian Emigration, Remittances, and the Rise of Made-in-Italy,” in “The Routledge History of the Italian Americans” (New York/London: Routledge, 2018) 
 “The Frontier Thesis in Transnational Migration: The U.S. West in the Making of Italy Abroad,” in “Immigrants in the Far West: Historical Identities and Experiences” (Salt Lake City: University of Utah Press, 2015) 
 "New Dynamics and New Imperial Powers, 1876-1905," in The Routledge History of Western Empires (Oxford/New York: Routledge, 2014) 

 
 "National Communications for a Transnational Community: Italy's promotion of italianità among emigrants, 1870-1920," in Transnational Political Spaces: Agents - Structures - Encounters (Frankfurt/New York: Campus Verlag, 2009)

References 

Living people
Yale College alumni
Brigham Young University faculty
United States Army personnel of the War in Afghanistan (2001–2021)
United States Army War College alumni
Fellows of the Royal Historical Society
Writers from Oklahoma
Year of birth missing (living people)
Place of birth missing (living people)